Hikmet Bilâ (1954 – 21 October 2011) was a Turkish journalist and columnist. He was the author of three books about Turkish political history.

Biography 
He was born in Zonguldak in 1954. After graduating from high school, he was admitted to Ankara University, Faculty of Political Sciences and earned his B.A. degree from international relations department.

Hikmet Bilâ started his journalism career in daily newspaper Yeni Ulus in 1973. He wrote columns in several Turkish newspapers including Milliyet, Cumhuriyet, and Vatan. He worked as editor-in-chief at leading news channel of Turkey, NTV.

He died on 21 October 2011 in his Ankara home after suffering for 1,5 years from lung cancer. His funeral was held at Teşvikiye Mosque and buried in Ulus Cemetery on 22 October 2011.

His brother Fikret Bilâ wrote a sad and mournful article about Hikmet Bilâ after the funeral.

Books 
 Sosyal Demokrat Süreç İçinde CHP ve Sonrası, Milliyet Yayınları (1987), 560pp.
 12 Eylül: Türkiye'nin Miladı, Doğan Kitap (2002), 239pp, (with Mehmet Ali Birand and Rıdvan Akar).
 CHP 1919-2009, Doğan Kitap (2008), 472pp, .

References 

1954 births
2011 deaths
People from Zonguldak
Turkish columnists
Ankara University Faculty of Political Sciences alumni
Deaths from lung cancer in Turkey
Milliyet people
Cumhuriyet people
Date of birth unknown
Burials at Ulus Cemetery
20th-century Turkish people